Toilet Goods Association, Inc. v. Gardner, 387 U.S. 158 (1967), was a case heard before the United States Supreme Court. It held that judicial review of a regulation's validity was inappropriate because the controversy was not ripe for adjudication. Since it was not clear whether or not an inspection would be ordered and the reasons had not been given by the Commissioner to justify his order, no primary conduct was affected and so no irremediable adverse consequences flowed from requiring a later challenge to the regulation by a manufacturer, who refused to allow inspection.

Facts 
The Toilet Goods Association was an organization of cosmetic manufacturers accounting for 90% of annual American sales in the field.

The Commissioner of the Food and Drug Administration promulgated a rule that stated, in part:
"(a) When it appears to the Commissioner that a person has:"
"(4) Refused to permit duly authorized employees of the Food and Drug Administration free access to all manufacturing facilities, processes, and the formulae involved in the manufacture of the color additives and intermediates from which such color additives are derived; he may immediately suspend certification service to such person and may continue such suspension until adequate corrective action has been taken."

Decision
Justice Harlan wrote, "In determining whether a challenge to an administrative regulation is ripe for review a twofold inquiry must be made: first to determine whether the issues tendered are appropriate for judicial resolution, and second to assess the hardship to the parties if judicial relief is denied at that stage."

The issues were appropriate for judicial resolution. The regulation states that the commissioner may order an inspection and that a permit may be refused.

There was no excessive hardship on the parties. Unlike in other cases, failure to comply with the rule resulted in, at most, a suspension of a certification. Fines, seizures of goods, and criminal liability were not present.

See also
List of United States Supreme Court cases, volume 387
Abbott Laboratories v. Gardner 387 U.S. 136 (1967)

References

External links
 

United States Constitution Article Three case law
United States Supreme Court cases
United States Supreme Court cases of the Warren Court
United States administrative case law
1967 in United States case law
United States ripeness case law